Goyenda Junior is a 2019 Bengali mystery drama film directed by Mainak Bhaumik, produced by Srikant Mohta and Mahendra Soni. The film was released on 20 September 2019 under the banner Shree Venkatesh Films.

Plot 
The parents of Bikram succumb to a road accident, leaving the 16-year old devastated and depressed. A year later, he is living with uncle and aunt, reading detective stories. His dream is to solve crimes like those he reads about fictional detectives like Sherlock Holmes and Hercule Poirot. His uncle, Barun, works with the police to investigate cases. One day, Bikram goes to his uncle's office and is spotted by Sanjay, the senior police detective, for his keen observation skills. Sanjay's daughter Tuki is the secrete crush of Bikram. Smart Bikram gets drawn into the world of espionage when the murder of a high-profile person comes to light. He begins to assist Sanjay with the investigation that seems to be a 'perfect crime' where the murder seems to appear as a natural death.

Cast 
 Rwitobroto Mukherjee as Bikram
 Shantilal Mukherjee as Sanjay
 Krishnendu Adhikari as Barun
 Anusha Vishwanathan as Tuki
 Debmallyo Gupta 
 Pushan Dasgupta
 Prantik Banerjee

Soundtrack

Release
The film was released on 20 September 2019 under the banner Shree Venkatesh Films.

References

External links
 

2019 films
Bengali-language Indian films
2010s Bengali-language films
2019 thriller drama films
Indian thriller drama films
Films directed by Mainak Bhaumik
2019 drama films